The Internazionali Femminili di Palermo, also known as the Palermo Ladies Open, is a women's tennis tournament in Palermo, Italy that is played on outdoor clay courts at the Country Time Club. The first two editions were part of the Satellite Circuit, but since 1990 it has been part of the WTA Tour. The tournament was categorized as either a WTA Tier IV or Tier V event from 1990 to 2008 and became an International Tournament in 2009. In 2014, the license for the event was sold to Kuala Lumpur's Malaysian Open for 6 years (contract for 3 years with an option for additional three). The tournament returned to Palermo in 2019 as a WTA International event, replacing Jiangxi International Women's Tennis Open which was moved to the autumn calendar as part of the China Open series.

Past finals

Singles

Doubles

See also
 Campionati Internazionali di Sicilia – men's tournament (1935–2006)
 List of tennis tournaments

References

External links
 Official website  
 Winners list

 
Sport in Sicily
Clay court tennis tournaments
WTA Tour
1988 establishments in Italy
2013 disestablishments in Italy
Recurring sporting events established in 1988
Recurring events disestablished in 2013
Annual sporting events in Italy